Vedanayagipuram is a village in the Orathanadu taluk of Thanjavur district, Tamil Nadu, India.

Demographics 
At the 2001 census, Vedanayagipuram had a total population of 312 with 156 males and 156 females. The sex ratio was 1.000. The literacy rate was 56.09.

References 
 

Villages in Thanjavur district